Arame or Aramu (Ruled 858–844 BC) was the first known king of Urartu.

Living at the time of King Shalmaneser III of Assyria (ruled 859–824 BC), Arame fought against the threat of the Assyrian Empire. His capital at Arzashkun was captured by Shalmaneser. Sagunia, a previous capital, which was also captured by Shalamaneser, seems to have been located in the vicinity of Lake Van or Lake Urmia.

Arame has been suggested as the prototype of both Aram (and, correspondingly the popular given name Aram) and Ara the Beautiful, two of the legendary forefathers of the Armenian people. Khorenatsi's History (1.5) puts them six and seven generations after Haik, in the chronology of historian Mikayel Chamchian dated to the 19th to 18th century BC.

The name Arame is likely an Armenian name originally derived from Proto-Indo-European *rēmo-, meaning "black". The name is likely etymologically related to Hindu Rama.

He is not to be confused with the another king Aramu (also known as Adramu and Atarsamek) who ruled at the same time in Bit Agusi and also fought Shalemaneser III.

See also

 List of kings of Urartu

References

David Marshall Lang, Armenia: Cradle of Civilization (1970).

Urartian kings
9th-century BC rulers